is a railway station in the city of  Kiyosu, Aichi Prefecture, Japan, operated by Central Japan Railway Company (JR Tōkai) and the Tōkai Transport Service Company (TKJ).

Lines
Biwajima Station is served by the Tōkaidō Main Line, and is located 370.0 kilometers from the starting point of the line at Tokyo Station.

Station layout
The station has two island platforms connected by a footbridge. The station building has automated ticket machines, TOICA automated turnstiles and a staffed ticket office.

Platforms

Adjacent stations

|-
!colspan=5|Central Japan Railway Company

|-
!colspan=5|Tōkai Transport Service Company

Station history
The station was relocated to its present location and renamed to its present name on April 16, 1906. The JGR became the JNR after World War II. The station building was rebuilt in March 1953. Along with the division and privatization of JNR on April 1, 1987, the station came under the control and operation of the Central Japan Railway Company. All freight services came to an end in 2006. A new station building was completed in December 2008.

Station numbering was introduced to the section of the Tōkaidō Line operated JR Central in March 2018; Biwajima Station was assigned station number CA69.

Passenger statistics
In fiscal 2013, the station was used by an average of 3886 passengers daily.

Surrounding area
former Nishibiwajima Town Hall

See also
 List of Railway Stations in Japan

References

Yoshikawa, Fumio. Tokaido-sen 130-nen no ayumi. Grand-Prix Publishing (2002) .

External links

official home page

Railway stations in Japan opened in 1886
Railway stations in Aichi Prefecture
Tōkaidō Main Line
Stations of Central Japan Railway Company
Kiyosu, Aichi